The 122nd Ohio Infantry Regiment, sometimes 122nd Ohio Volunteer Infantry (or 122nd OVI) was an infantry regiment in the Union Army during the American Civil War.

Service
The 122nd Ohio Infantry was organized at Zanesville, Ohio, and mustered in for three years service on September 30, 1862, under the command of Colonel William H. Ball.  (Company C mustered in October 3, Company G mustered in October 5, Company F mustered in October 6, and Companies I and K mustered on October 8, 1862.)

The regiment was attached to Railroad Division, Western Virginia, to January 1863. Milroy's Command, Winchester, Va., VIII Corps, Middle Department, to February 1863. 1st Brigade, 2nd Division, VIII Corps, to June 1863. Elliott's Command, VIII Corps, to July 1863. 2nd Brigade, 3rd Division, III Corps, Army of the Potomac, to March 1864. 2nd Brigade, 3rd Division, VI Corps, Army of the Potomac, and Army of the Shenandoah, Middle Military Division, to June 1865.

The 122nd Ohio Infantry mustered out of service at Washington, D.C. on June 26, 1865.

Detailed service

Casualties
The regiment lost a total of 230 men during service; 7 officers and 86 enlisted men killed or mortally wounded, 137 enlisted men died of disease.

Commanders
 Colonel William H. Ball
 Lieutenant Colonel Moses M. Granger - commanded at the Second Battle of Winchester
 Captain Charles J. Gibeaut - commander of Company E - killed by a bullet wound to the head at the Second Battle of Winchester

Notable members
 Private George A. Loyd, Company A - Medal of Honor recipient for action at Petersburg
 Chaplain Charles Caldwell McCabe - Chancellor of American University, 1902–1906; bishop of the Methodist Episcopal Church
 Principal Musician John T. Patterson - Medal of Honor recipient for action at the battle of Opequan
 Private Elbridge Robinson, Company C - Medal of Honor recipient for action at the battle of Opequan

See also

 List of Ohio Civil War units
 Ohio in the Civil War

References

 Bristol, Frank Milton. The Life of Chaplain McCabe: Bishop of the Methodist Episcopal Church (Cincinnati:  Jennings and Graham), 1908.
 Dyer, Frederick H. A Compendium of the War of the Rebellion (Des Moines, IA:  Dyer Pub. Co.), 1908.
 Granger, Moses M. The Official War Record of the 122nd Regiment of Ohio Volunteer Infantry from October 8, 1862, to June 26, 1865 (Zanesville, OH: G. Lilienthal), 1912.
 Hartley, James J.  The Civil War Letters of the Late 1st Lieut. James J. Hartley, 122nd Ohio Infantry Regiment (Jefferson, NC:  McFarland & Co.), 1998. 
 Ohio Roster Commission. Official Roster of the Soldiers of the State of Ohio in the War on the Rebellion, 1861–1865, Compiled Under the Direction of the Roster Commission (Akron, OH: Werner Co.), 1886–1895.
 Reid, Whitelaw. Ohio in the War: Her Statesmen, Her Generals, and Soldiers (Cincinnati, OH: Moore, Wilstach, & Baldwin), 1868.
Attribution

External links
 Ohio in the Civil War: 122nd Ohio Volunteer Infantry by Larry Stevens
 National flag of the 122nd Ohio Infantry (probably the regiment's first)
 National flag of the 122nd Ohio Infantry
 Regimental flag of the 122nd Ohio Infantry
 122nd Ohio Infantry Descendants Association 

Military units and formations established in 1862
Military units and formations disestablished in 1865
Units and formations of the Union Army from Ohio
1862 establishments in Ohio